Riaan Botha (born 8 November 1970 in Pretoria) is a retired South African pole vaulter.

His personal best is 5.91 metres, achieved in April 1997 in Pretoria. This places him second on the African all-time performers list, behind fellow South African Okkert Brits.

Achievements

References

External links

1970 births
Living people
South African male pole vaulters
Athletes (track and field) at the 1996 Summer Olympics
Athletes (track and field) at the 1994 Commonwealth Games
Athletes (track and field) at the 1998 Commonwealth Games
Olympic athletes of South Africa
Commonwealth Games gold medallists for South Africa
Sportspeople from Pretoria
Commonwealth Games medallists in athletics
Athletes (track and field) at the 1999 All-Africa Games
African Games competitors for South Africa
Medallists at the 1998 Commonwealth Games